Elek is a surname. Notable people with the surname include:

Ákos Elek (born 1988), Hungarian football player 
Attila Elek (born 1982), Hungarian ice dancer
Ferenc Elek (born 1974), Hungarian actor
Gábor Elek (born 1970), Hungarian handball player coach 
Gyula Elek (1932–2012), Hungarian handball player
György Elek (born 1984), Hungarian competitive ice dancer
Ilona Elek (1907–1988), Hungarian Olympic fencer
Judit Elek (born 1937), Hungarian film director and screenwriter
Margit Elek (1910–1986), Hungarian Olympic foil fencer
Paul Elek, British publisher
Róbert Elek (born 1988), Romanian football player
Zoltan Elek, makeup artist

See also
Elek (given name)

Hungarian-language surnames